Caojia Town is a town of Xinhua County in Hunan, China. The town was reformed through the amalgamation of the four townships of Niangjia, Shenli, Xiaoyang and Shuijiang in 1995.

The town is located in the central east of the county, it is bordered by Jiqing Town and Zuoshi Township to the north, by Sangzi Town to the east, by the subdistrict of Shangdu to the south, by Youjia Town and Youxi Township to the west. The town has 23 villages under its jurisdiction in 2017.

Administrative division
In 2017, Caojia Town transferred a community and six villages to Shangdu Subdistrict, the town has 23 villages under its jurisdiction.

23 villages
 Baixing Village
 Baoyanling Village
 Caojia Village
 Chengping Village
 Dakangyuan Village
 Fuping Village
 Gaojian Village
 Lishanping Village
 Lixin Village
 Lujia Village
 Meihuadong Village
 Mushan Xincun Village
 Shilipu Village
 Shuangjiang Village
 Shuijiang Village
 Shuizhu Village
 Siwu Village
 Xiaoyang Village
 Xuantang Village
 Yifu Village
 Yuxi Village
 Zaitian Village
 Zimuchong Village
 Xinyuan Community

the following a community and six villages were moved to Shangmei Town,
 Niangjia Village
 Qingyun Village
 Qinjian Village
 Qinsan Village
 Tianzhu Village
 Zhimushan Village

References

External links

Divisions of Xinhua County